This World Is Going to Ruin You is the second studio album by American hardcore punk band Vein.fm (formerly Vein), which was released on March 4, 2022, through Closed Casket Activities and Nuclear Blast. It was recorded in April 2020, shortly after the start of the COVID-19 lockdowns. The album was produced in the Graphic Nature Audio studio by Will Putney of Fit for an Autopsy.

Release 
The band released the lead single from the album, "The Killing Womb", on January 5, 2022, and announced that the album would be released later on March 4, 2022. On January 25, 2022, the band released the second single "Fear in Non Fiction". The album's final single, "Wavery" was released on February 15, 2022.

Reception 

The album has received generally positive reviews, with Kerrang! calling it "a startlingly ambitious piece of work from a truly iconoclastic band." Vocalist Anthony DiDio said of the album, "This record is Vein.fm coming home."

Musical style 
Gabe La Torre of No Echo said that the album was thrilling in its unpredictability, while Jack Terry of Distorted Sound Magazine called the album "the aural equivalent of a psychological slasher horror", and also compares some aspects of the album to Slipknot, thanks to the turntables done by Benno Levine.

Track listing

Personnel 
Vein.fm
Anthony DiDio – vocals
Matt Wood – drums
Jeremy Martin – guitar, vocals
Jon Lhaubouet – bass
Benno Levine – turntables

Production
Will Putney – production, engineering, mixing, mastering

Additional personnel
Elmo O'Connor (BONES) - guest vocals on "Orgy in the Morgue"
Autumn Morgan – artwork
Geoff Rickly (Thursday) - guest vocals on "Fear in Non Fiction"
Steve Said – engineer
Jeff Smith (Jeromes Dream) - guest vocals on "Hellnight"
Randy LeBoeuf – piano

References

External links
This World Is Going to Ruin You on Bandcamp

2022 albums
Vein (band) albums
Albums produced by Will Putney